Paali is a village in Kambja Parish, Tartu County, Estonia.

References

 

Villages in Tartu County